{{Infobox tennis circuit season
| 2017 WTA Awards

| player_of_the_year               =  Garbiñe Muguruza
| most_improved_player_of_the_year =  Jeļena Ostapenko
| newcomer_of_the_year             =  Catherine Bellis
| comeback_player_of_the_year      =  Sloane Stephens
| previous = 2016
| next     = 2018
}}

The 2017 WTA Awards are a series of awards given by the Women's Tennis Association to players who have achieved something remarkable during the 2017 WTA Tour.

The awards
These awards are decided by either the media, the players, the association, or the fans. Nominees were announced by the WTA's Twitter account.

Note: award winners in bold

Player of the Year
 Garbiñe Muguruza Simona Halep
 Jeļena Ostapenko
 Karolína Plíšková
 Elina Svitolina
 Venus Williams

Doubles Team of the Year Chan Yung-jan &  Martina Hingis Ekaterina Makarova &  Elena Vesnina
 Bethanie Mattek-Sands &  Lucie Šafářová

Most Improved Player of the Year
 Caroline Garcia
 Kristina Mladenovic
 Jeļena Ostapenko Elina Svitolina
 CoCo Vandeweghe

Newcomer of the Year
 Catherine Bellis Beatriz Haddad Maia
 Elise Mertens
 Markéta Vondroušová

Comeback Player of the Year
 Sloane Stephens Ashleigh Barty
 Madison Keys
 Petra Kvitová

Karen Krantzcke Sportsmanship Award
 Petra KvitováPeachy Kellmeyer Player Service Award
 Lucie ŠafářováDiamond Aces
 Angelique KerberFan Favourite Player
 Serena Williams
 Elena Vesnina
 Maria Sharapova
 Garbiñe Muguruza
 Simona Halep Ashleigh Barty
 CoCo Vandeweghe
 Lucie Šafářová
 Dominika Cibulková
 Caroline Garcia
 Johanna Konta
 Agnieszka Radwańska
 Kristina Mladenovic
 Petra Kvitová
 Caroline Wozniacki
 Elina Svitolina
 Eugenie Bouchard
 Venus Williams
 Catherine Bellis
 Peng Shuai
 Karolína Plíšková
 Julia Görges
 Sloane Stephens
 Angelique Kerber
 Svetlana Kuznetsova
 Jeļena Ostapenko

Fan Favorite WTA Shot of the Year
 Agnieszka Radwańska, 2017 Sydney International second round (27%)
 Caroline Wozniacki, 2017 Miami Open quarterfinals (8%)
 Daria Kasatkina, 2017 Canadian Open first round (10%)
 Agnieszka Radwańska, 2017 Wuhan Open second round (55%)

Fan Favorite WTA Match of the Year Caroline Garcia vs  Elina Svitolina, China Open quarterfinals (6–7, 7–5, 7–6)()

Fan Favorite Grand Slam Match of the Year Maria Sharapova vs  Simona Halep, US Open first round (6–4, 4–6, 6–3)'''()

References

WTA Awards
WTA Awards